Sergio Tagliapietra (6 March 1935 – 6 October 2022) was an Italian rower. He competed at the 1956 Summer Olympics and the 1964 Summer Olympics.

References

External links
 

1935 births
2022 deaths
Italian male rowers
Olympic rowers of Italy
Rowers at the 1956 Summer Olympics
Rowers at the 1964 Summer Olympics
Sportspeople from Venice